José Triana Matamoros (born 30 November 1948) is a Cuban former sprinter who competed in the 1972 Summer Olympics.

References

External links
 1975 Pan American 4 x 100 metres relay final

1935 births
Living people
Cuban male sprinters
Olympic athletes of Cuba
Athletes (track and field) at the 1972 Summer Olympics
Pan American Games medalists in athletics (track and field)
Pan American Games silver medalists for Cuba
Athletes (track and field) at the 1971 Pan American Games
Athletes (track and field) at the 1975 Pan American Games
Competitors at the 1970 Central American and Caribbean Games
Competitors at the 1974 Central American and Caribbean Games
Central American and Caribbean Games gold medalists for Cuba
Universiade silver medalists for Cuba
Universiade medalists in athletics (track and field)
Central American and Caribbean Games medalists in athletics
Medalists at the 1970 Summer Universiade
Medalists at the 1975 Pan American Games
20th-century Cuban people